Arquivo may refer to:

Portuguese and Spanish word for archive
Arquivo (album), an album by Os Paralamas do Sucesso
An album by Yahoo